Caine Woolerton (born 6 November 1999) is a Welsh rugby union player who plays for Ospreys regional team as a fullback.

Woolerton has yet to debut for the Ospreys regional team, but has represented the Wales Sevens team at 2 events.

References

External links 
Welsh Rugby Union Player Profile

Welsh rugby union players
Ospreys (rugby union) players
Living people
1999 births
Rugby union fullbacks